Qanbari (also Romanized as Qanbarī) is a village in Dodangeh Rural District, in the Central District of Behbahan County, Khuzestan Province, Iran. At the 2006 census, its population was 628, in 136 families.

References 

Populated places in Behbahan County